This is a list of newspapers published in, or for, the Great Southern region of Western Australia.

Titles

See also 
 List of newspapers in Western Australia
 Pilbara newspapers
 Kimberley newspapers
 Gascoyne newspapers
 Mid West newspapers
 Goldfields-Esperance newspapers
 Wheatbelt newspapers

References 

Lists of newspapers published in Western Australia
Newspapers published in Western Australia by region
Great Southern (Western Australia)